The Neretva, also known as Narenta, is one of the largest rivers of the eastern part of the Adriatic basin. Four HE power-plants with large dams (higher than 150,5 metres) provide flood protection, power and water storage. It is recognized for its natural environment and diversity of its landscape.

Freshwater ecosystems have suffered from an increasing population and the associated development pressures. One of the most valuable natural resources of Bosnia and Herzegovina and Croatia is its freshwater resource, contained by an abundant wellspring and clear rivers. Situated between the major regional rivers (Drina river on the east, Una river on the west and the Sava river) the Neretva basin contains the most significant source of drinking water.

The Neretva is notable among rivers of the Dinaric Alps region, especially regarding its diverse ecosystems and habitats, flora and fauna, cultural and historic heritage.

Its name has been suggested to come from the Indo-European root *ner, meaning "to dive". The same root is seen in the Serbo-Croatian root "roniti".

Geography and hydrology 
The Neretva flows through Bosnia and Herzegovina and Croatia until reaching the Adriatic Sea. It is the largest karst river in the Dinaric Alps in the eastern part of the Adriatic basin/watershed.

The average discharge at profile Žitomislići in Bosnia and Herzegovina is /s and at the mouth in Croatia is /s in addition to the Trebišnjica River's /s. The Trebišnjica River basin is included in the Neretva watershed due to a physical link of the two basins by the porous karst terrain.

The hydrological parameters of Neretva are regularly monitored in Croatia at Metković.

Sections 

Geographically and hydrologically the Neretva is divided into three sections.

Its source and headwaters gorge are situated deep in the Dinaric Alps at the base of the Zelengora and Lebršnik mountains, specifically under the Gredelj saddle. The river source is at 1,227 meters above sea level and consists of five small and distinct wellsprings. On its 90 kilometers course through the first section the Neretva cuts two distinct deep and narrow canyons and two distinct wide and fertile valleys, around Ulog and then around Glavatičevo, before it reaches town of Konjic. Right below Konjic, the Neretva again expands into a third and largest valley which provided fertile agricultural land before it was flooded by large artificial reservoir, Jablaničko Lake, formed after construction of a Jablanica Dam near town of Jablanica.

The second section begins from the confluence of the Neretva and the Rama between Konjic and Jablanica where the Neretva suddenly takes almost 180° degrees turn toward east-southeast and flows the short leg before reaches town of Jablanica, from which point turns again toward south. From Jablanica, the Neretva enters third and the largest canyon on its course, running through the steep slopes mountains of Prenj, Čvrsnica and Čabulja reaching  in depth. Three hydroelectric dams operate between Jablanica and Mostar.

When the Neretva expands for the second and final time, it reaches its third section. This area is often colloquially called the "Bosnian and Herzegovinian California". The last  of its course forms wide alluvial delta, before the river empties into the Adriatic Sea.

Tributaries 
Rivers of the Tatinac (also known as the Jezernica), the Gornji Krupac and Donji Krupac, the Ljuta (also known as the Dindolka), the Jesenica, the Bjelimićka Rijeka, the Slatinica, the Račica, the Rakitnica, the Ljuta (Konjička), the Trešanica, the Neretvica, the Rama, Doljanka, the Drežanka, the Grabovica, the Radobolja, and the Trebižat flow into the Neretva from the right, while the Jezernica, the Živanjski Potok (also known as the Živašnica), the Lađanica, the Krupac, the Bukovica, the Šištica, the Bijela, the Idbar, the Glogošnica, the Mostarska Bijela, the Buna, the Bregava, and the Krupa flow into it from the left.

Towns and villages 
Towns and villages on the Neretva include Ulog, Glavatičevo, Konjic, Čelebići, Ostrožac, Jablanica, Grabovica, Drežnica, Bijelo polje, Vrapčići, Mostar, Buna village, the historical town of Blagaj, Žitomislići, the historical village of Počitelj, Tasovčići, Čapljina, and Gabela in Bosnia and Herzegovina; and Metković, Opuzen, Komin, Rogotin, and Ploče in Croatia. The biggest town on the Neretva River is Mostar in Bosnia and Herzegovina.

Upper Neretva 

The upper course of the Neretva river is simply called the Upper Neretva . It includes numerous streams and well-springs, three major glacial lakes near the river and more lakes scattered across the mountains of Treskavica and Zelengora in the wider area, mountains, peaks and forests, flora and fauna of the area.
The Upper Neretva has water of Class I purity and is almost certainly the coldest river water in the world, often as low as 7–8 degrees Celsius in the summer months.
Rising from the base of the Zelengora and Lebršnik Mountain, Neretva headwaters run in undisturbed rapids and waterfalls, carving steep gorges reaching  in depth.

Rakitnica River 

The Rakitnica is the main tributary of the first section.
From the canyon, a hiking trail along the ridge of the Rakitnica canyon drops 800 m below, to the famous village of Lukomir. The village is the only remaining traditional semi-nomadic Bosniak mountain village in Bosnia and Herzegovina.
At almost 1,500 m, Lukomir features stone homes with cherry-wood roof tiles. It is the country's highest and most isolated mountain village. The village is inaccessible from the first snows in December until late April and sometimes even later, except by skis or on foot.

Middle Neretva

Hydrographically the Middle Neretva section begins from town of Konjic, but after the construction of Jablanica Hydroelectric Power Station and flooding of large fertile valley between Konjic and Jablanica, known simply as "Neretva" since Middle Ages, the new point for hydrographical division became dam of the Jablanica HPP where also is a place of confluence of the rivers Neretva and Rama. Here the Neretva river suddenly takes almost 180° degrees turn toward east-southeast and flows the short leg before it reach town of Jablanica.
This section is characterized with steep and relatively narrow canyon, and rugged karstic geology and hydrology. Four enormous vales-size rifts appear in the mountainsides forming canyon walls, two from each sides of the river, intersecting with the main canyon almost perpendicularly. The Neretva receives only four small streams in this section, all running through these side-vales, which are relatively short. Going downstream from Jablanica, first two from each side are the Glogošnica stream, its eponymous canyon and small village, at the left, and the Grabovica stream with eponymous canyon and historical village, from the right side. Further downstream two much larger vales appear again on each side, first on the right the stream of Drežanka and its large and steep valley, with two eponymous villages, Donja (Lower) and Gornja (Upper) Drežnica, and than Mostarska Bijela, as one of the most pristine vales in Bosnia and Herzegovina, with its eponymous uniquely characteristic subterranean stream, embedded deep into the Prenj mountain, on the left.
Although these streams are of low outflow, there are also numerous wellsprings rising on both sides of the canyon at the river banks, with high-capacity discharge.
Three large hydroelectric power stations operate in this section of the Neretva, between Jablanica and Mostar, namely Grabovica HPP, Salakovac HPP and Mostar HPP.

Lakes 

Jablanica lake is a large artificial lake on the Neretva river, right below Konjic where the Neretva expands into a wide valley. The river provided fertile, agricultural land before the lake flooded most of it. The lake was created in 1953 after construction of a largegravitational hydroelectric dam near Jablanica in central Bosnia and Herzegovina. The lake has an irregular, elongated shape, and its width varies along its length. The lake is a popular vacation destination.

Lower Neretva 
Downstream from the confluence of its tributaries, the Trebižat and Bregava Rivers, the valley spreads into an alluvial fan covering . The upper valley, the 7,411 hectares in Bosnia and Herzegovina, is called Hutovo Blato.

Hutovo Blato wetlands

The Neretva Delta has been recognised as a Ramsar site since 1992, and Hutovo Blato since 2001. Both areas form one integrated Ramsar site that is a natural entity divided by the state border. The Important Bird Areas programme, conducted by Birdlife International, covers protected areas in Croatia and Bosnia and Herzegovina.

Since 1995, Hutovo Blato has been protected as Hutovo Blato Nature Park and managed by a public authority. The whole zone is protected from human impact and provides habitat for many plants and animals. The historical site Old Fortress Hutovo Blato is in the Nature Park.

Gornje Blato-Deransko Lake is supplied by the karstic water sources of the Trebišnjica River, emerging from bordering hills. It is hydro-geologically connected to the Neretva River through its effluent, the Krupa River, formed out of five lakes (Škrka, Deranja, Jelim, Orah, Drijen). Large portions are permanently flooded and isolated by wide groves of reedbebds and trees. It represents a more interesting preserved area.

Krupa River

The Krupa River is a Neretva left tributary and the main water current of Hutovo Blato, which carries the waters from Gornje Blato and Svitavsko Lake into the Neretva River. The Krupa does not have a specific source, but is an arm of Deransko Lake. Also, the Krupa is a unique river in Europe, because it flows both ways. It flows both towards and back from its mouth. This happens when a high water level causes Neretva to push Krupa in the opposite direction.

Neretva Delta wetlands 

Passing towns and villages in Bosnia and Herzegovina, the Neretva spills out into the Adriatic Sea, building a wetland delta that is listed under the Ramsar Convention as internationally important.

In this lower alluvial valley in Croatia, the Neretva River splinters into multiple courses, creating a delta covering approximately 12,000 hectares. The delta in Croatia has been reduced by extensive land reclamation projects, reducing the river flows to just three branches from the original twelve. The marshes, lagoons and lakes that once dotted this plain have disappeared and only fragments of the old Mediterranean wetlands survive. Wetlands, marshes and lagoons, lakes, beaches, rivers, hummocks (limestone hills) and mountains compose the delta, with five protected areas with a total area of 1,620 ha. These are ornithological, ichthyologic and landscape reserves.

Endemic and endangered species 

Dinaric karst water systems support 25% of the total of 546 fish species in Europe, many endemic.
The Neretva River, together with four other areas in the Mediterranean, has the largest number of threatened freshwater fish species.
The degree of endemism in the karst ecoregion is greater than 10%. Multiple fish species have small habitats and are vulnerable, so they are included on the Red List of endangered fish . The Adriatic basin has 88 species of fish, of which 44 are Mediterranean endemic species, and 41 are Adriatic endemic species. More than half of the Adriatic river basin species of fish inhabit the Neretva, the Ombla, the Trebišnjica, the Morača Rivers and their tributaries, and more than 30 are endemic.

Invasive species 

A pike perch (Sander lucioperca Linnaeus 1758) (also see Sander (genus)) population in the Neretva River watershed was observed in 1990 for the first time. The Rama River, a right tributary of the Neretva, and its Rama Lake received an unknown quantity of this allochthonous species. Population estimates have increased in the Neretva accumulation lakes. This fact confirms previous scientific assumptions of Škrijelj (1991, 1995), who predicted the possibility of pike perch displacement (migration) from Ramsko Lake to the Rama River and then further downstream to the river and its lakes.
In 1990 the perch population made up 1.95% of the fish population in Rama Lake. Within a decade this rose to 25.42% in the nearby Jablaničko Lake.

The fast pace of pike perch population growth and displacements is expected to match the environmental conditions from the mid-ecological valence of this fish.
In this sense, it is the established continuous and accelerated growth of the population dynamics of pike perch in Jablaničko Lake, a relatively good representation in Salakovačko Lake and the beginning of growth of population in Grabovičko Lake.
Parallel with the increase in pike perch is a decrease in endemic indigenous species like European chub also white chub (Squalius cephalus), and the disappearance of rare and endemic species like Adriatic Dace also Balkan dace (Squalius svallize also Leuciscus svallize Heckel & Kner 1858), Neretvan softmouth trout (Salmothymus obtusirostris oxyrhinchus Steind.) and marble trout (Salmo marmoratus Cuv.).

Pike perch causes clearly visible, negative effects on the autochthonous species in Jablaničko Lake. In Salakovačko Lake these effects are in progress, although less visible, while in Grabovičko Lake it is not yet clearly visible.

Salmonids 

Salmonid fish from the Neretva basin show considerable variation in morphology, ecology and behaviour.

Among most endangered are three endemic species of trout: Neretvan softmouth trout (Salmothymus obtusirostris oxyrhinchus Steind.), Toothtrout (Salmo dentex)
and marble trout ((Salmo marmoratus Cuv.).

All three endemic trout species of the Neretva are endangered, mostly due to the habitat destruction or construction of large/major dams ("large" is higher than 15–20 m; "major" is over 150–250 m). Other problems include hybridization or genetic pollution with introduced, non-native trouts, illegal fishing and poor water and fisheries management.

Cyprinids 

The most endangered cyprinids (family Cyprinidae) are endemic.

Especially interesting are five Phoxinellus (sub)species that inhabit isolated karstic plains (fields) of eastern as well as western Herzegovina in Bosnia and Herzegovina, which eventually reach the Neretva watershed and/or coastal drainages of south-eastern Dalmatia.

 Karst minnow (Phoxinellus metohiensis) is considered Vulnerable (VU).
 South Dalmatian minnow (Phoxinellus pstrossii) is threatened, but was marked Data Deficient (DD) and was not designated on IUCN Red List of Threatened Species Version 2009.1.
 Dalmatian minnow (Phoxinellus ghetaldii) is considered vulnerable.
 Adriatic minnow (Phoxinellus alepidotus) is endemic to Bosnia and Herzegovina and Croatia and occurs in lowland water bodies with little current. It is threatened due to pollution and habitat destruction. It is considered endangered.
 Spotted minnow (Phoxinellus adspersus), is endemic in the Tihaljina River, which is fed by underground waters from Imotsko field and is connected to the Trebižat river via the Mlada River. It also occurs in Mostarsko Blato wetlands. Fish were found in the source of the Norin River, a right-hand tributary of the lower Neretva at Metković, in Croatia, at Kuti Lake, a left-hand tributary of the lower Neretva, at Imotsko field in Red Lake (Croatia) and the Vrljika river drainage and near Vrgorac in the Matica River system. It is considered vulnerable.
 Minnow nase (Chondrostoma phoxinus) is considered Critically Endangered (CR)
 Neretvan nase (also Dalmatian nase and Dalmatian soiffe) (Chondrostoma knerii) is endemic to the Neretva. Neretvan nase is mainly distributed in the lower parts and delta, the Krupa River, Nature Park Hutovo Blato wetlands and Neretva Delta wetlands. It occurs in water bodies with little current. It is threatened by habitat destruction and pollution. It is considered Vulnerable (VU).
 Adriatic dace also Balkan dace (Squalius svallize also Leuciscus svallize Heckel & Kner 1858) is a vulnerable endemic, although also found in Montenegro and Albania. Adults inhabit water bodies on the low plains, with little current and in lakes. They feed on invertebrates. It is threatened due to pollution, habitat destruction and due to introduction of other species.
 Illyrian dace (Squalius illyricus also Leuciscus illyricus Heckel & Kner 1858) inhabits karstic waters of Bosnia and Herzegovina, Croatia and Albania. It occurs in water courses on low plains, with little current. It feeds on invertebrates. It is stressed by habitat destruction, pollution and introduced species. It is considered Near Threatened (NT).
 Turskyi dace (Leuciscus turskyi also Squalius turskyi turskyi and Telestes turskyi) inhabits karstic waters, lake Buško Blato and the Krka and Čikola rivers. It occurs on the low plains, with little current and in lakes. It feeds on invertebrates. Threats include water abstraction and pollution. It is considered Critically Endangered (CR).
 Dalmatian barbelgudgeon (Aulopyge hugeli) inhabits karstic streams of Glamocko field, Livanjsko field and Duvanjsko field, lakes Buško Blato, Blidinje and Cetina, Krka and Zrmanja river drainages. It occurs in lentic waters and feeds on plants. The fish is threatened by water pollution and habitat destruction and is considered endangered. It is migratory in Livanjsko field.

Cobitidae 

The Neretvan spined loach (Cobitis narentana Karaman, 1928) is an Adriatic watershed endemic that inhabits a narrow area of the Neretva watershed in Croatia and Bosnia and Herzegovina 
In Bosnia and Herzegovina it inhabits only the lower Neretva and its smaller tributaries like the Matica River.
In Croatia it is a strictly protected species and inhabits only the Neretva delta and its smaller tributaries, the (Norin) and lake systems of the Neretva delta (Baćina lakes, Kuti, Desne, Modro oko). It is considered Vulnerable (VU).

Neretva delta endemics 

The Neretva delta hosts more than 20 endemic species, of which 18 are endemic to the Adriatic watershed, along with three endemic species in Croatia.  Nearly half (45%) of the total number of species that inhabit this area are included in one of the categories of threat and are mainly endemic.

Hydroelectric controversy 

The benefits brought by hydroelectric dams have come at an environmental and social cost.
The waters of the Neretva river with its two main tributaries, the Rama and the Trebišnjica, are already harnessed by 9 (nine) Hydroelectric power plants with large dams, four on Neretva main stream, one with a major dam on the Rama tributary, and another three on the Trebišnjica River.

These facilities are as follows: 
on the Neretva: Jablanica Hydroelectric Power Station, Grabovica Hydroelectric Power Station, Salakovac Hydroelectric Power Station, Mostar Hydroelectric Power Station;
 on the Rama: Rama Hydroelectric Power Station;
 on the Trebišnjica: Trebinje-1 Hydroelectric Power Station, Trebinje-2 Hydroelectric Power Station, Čapljina Hydroelectric Power Station, Dubrovnik Hydroelectric Power Station (in Croatia).

There are additional number of hydroelectric power station of various capacity on smaller tributaries, such as Mostarsko Blato Hydroelectric Power Station on the Lištica (downstream from HPP named Jasenica), Peć Mlini Hydroelectric Power Station on the Trebižat, and numerous small hydro on the small river tributaries like Tatinac, Trešanica, Neretvica and Duščica, with a proposed small hydro on the rivers Doljanka, Glogošnica, and one abandoned on the Idbar.

Projects in Upper Neretva
The government of the Bosnia and Herzegovina has unveiled plans to build three more hydroelectric power plants with dams over 150.5 metres in height upstream from the existing plants, beginning with Glavaticevo Hydro Power Plant in the village of Glavatičevo, then going upstream to Bjelimići Hydro Power Plant and Ljubuča Hydro Power Plant located near the eponymous villages; and another, by the Republic of Srpska, at the Neretva headwaters gorge, near the source of the river. It is similarly opposed by environmental organizations and NGO's, such as Zeleni-Neretva Konjic and the World Wildlife Fund.

Meanwhile, Bosnia and Herzegovina entity, Federation of Bosnia and Herzegovina, was preparing a parallel plan to form a large, protected area as a national park which would include the entire region of Gornja Neretva, and have within the park the three hydroelectric plants. The latest idea is that the park should be divided in two, where the Neretva should be excluded from both and would become the boundary between parks. Those who oppose the plan wish to have the area turned into the National Park of Upper Neretva and would leave the park without substantial development.

Projects in Ulog
Since 2000's, the other entity of Bosnia, Republica Srpska, developed plans to construct up to eight Hydroelectric power plants, seven small hydroelectric power plants, and one large, namely HE Ulog, on the stretch of the Neretva with high ecological value, which lies within the entity administrative lines. This stretch consists of around 40 kilometers of the Neretva course between its source and entity line at Ljusići village. Opposition to these plans, and HE Ulog ongoing construction in particular, attracted both domestic and international experts, activists and public, who voiced their opposition with scientific arguments, even taking the issue to European Council. Irregularities in planning and design, flawed the environmental impact study and the complete absence of research work on the ground related to the geological instability of the terrain, as well as irregularities in the implementation of tenders and the issuance of environmental and construction permits, are particularly noteworthy. In the environmental impact study, the only significant impact, one that should be reflected on the downstream part of the Neretva watercourse, is completely ignored. Such drastic disregard in planning and designing, considering that the facilities of HE Ulog are located on the very line of demarcation of two ethnically based entities, which makes the downstream of the river located entirely in another administrative entity, where all the ecological consequences resulting from the use of Neretva water and the production of electricity will be felt exclusively, introduces, besides environmental, also an ethnic and political dimension to the issue.

The Upper Horizons - Trebišnjica
In recent times the Republic of Srpska government finished the project named The Upper Horizons, a large hydroelectric project that diverted underground waters in the Neretva watershed to the Trebišnjica plant and others in the Trebišnjica basin. This project was opposed by NGO's in Bosnia and Herzegovina and Croatia. They argued that the project would increase salinity levels of every surface and underground water on the right bank of the Neretva, damage internationally recognized Ramsar sites, a protected Nature Park Hutovo Blato in Bosnia and Herzegovina, protected Neretva Delta in Croatia, and important reservoirs of freshwater, plus agricultural lands in the lower Neretva valley.

Cultural and historical significance

Early history 
During antiquity, the Neretva was known as Narenta, Narona and Naro(n), and was the inland home to the ancient Illyrian tribe of Ardiaei. They became ship builders, seafarers and fishermen. Archaeological discoveries of Illyrian culture dealt both with daily and religious life such as the discovery of ancient Illyrian shipwrecks found in Hutovo Blato, in the vicinity of the Neretva River.

After intense excavations in the area of Hutovo Blato in the autumn of 2008, archaeologists from Bosnia and Herzegovina University of Mostar and Sweden University of Lund found traces of an Illyrian trading post that was more than two thousand years old.
The find is unique in a European perspective and archaeologists have concluded that Desilo, as the location is called, was an important trading post of great significance for contact between the Illyrians and the Romans.
Archaeological finds include the ruins of a settlement, the remains of a harbour that probably functioned as a trading post, as well as many sunken boats, fully laden with wine pitchers – so-called amphorae – from the 1st century BC.
Archaeologist Adam Lindhagen claimed that it was the most important Illyrian ruin.

Roman period 
One of the most significant monuments of Roman times in Bosnia and Herzegovina is Mogorjelo. Located 1 kilometer south of the town of Čapljina, Mogorjelo remnants of the old Roman suburban Villa Rustica from the 4th century represents ancient Roman agricultural production and estate, mills, bakeries, olive oil refinery and forges.
The Villa was destroyed in the middle of the 4th century, during the invasion of western Goths. Surviving residents did not restore it to its original splendor.
The name of Mogorjelo is thought to be derived either from the Slavic word for "burn" (Slavic – goriti) or that at the end of the 5th century the church was built on the ruins of the Villa, and was dedicated to St. Hermagor – Mogoru.

Middle Ages 

In the Early Middle Ages, the South Slavic Narentines held the region. They were known for piracy and resisted Christianization until they were defeated by the Venetians, and then the Byzantines, at the turn of the 10th and 11th centuries.

Along with notable medieval buildings, remains of Old City walls, and a sculpture of a stone lion – a symbol of Venetian culture survived.

Ottoman period 

The Old Bridge was commissioned by Suleiman the Magnificent in 1557 to replace an older wooden suspension bridge. Construction began in 1557 and took nine years: according to the inscription the bridge was completed in 974 AH, corresponding to the period between 19 July 1566 and 7 July 1567. Memories and legends and the name of the builder, Mimar Hayruddin (student of the Old/Great Sinan (Mimar Sinan / Koca Sinan), the Ottoman architect) were preserved in writing. Charged under pain of death to construct a bridge of such unprecedented dimensions, the architect reportedly prepared for his own funeral on the day the scaffolding was finally removed from the completed structure. Upon its completion it was the widest man-made arch in the world. Associated technical issues remain obscure: how the scaffolding was erected, how the stone was transported from one bank to the other, and how the scaffolding was maintained during construction. On 9 November 1993, during the war in Bosnia and Herzegovina it was destroyed by sustained artillery shelling. After the war, immediate plans were raised to reconstruct the bridge as a symbol of peace and ethnic harmony, literally bridging the two sides of the conflict. They attempted to reuse as much original material as possible. Salvage operations, funded by the international community, raised the stones and the remains of the bridge from the river bed. Missing elements or parts that were not usable were cut from the original quarry.
Now listed as a World Heritage Site, the bridge was rebuilt under the aegis of UNESCO. Its 1,088 stones were shaped according to the original techniques, at a cost of about €12 million. The grand opening was held on 23 July 2004.

It is traditional for the town's young men to leap from the  bridge into the Neretva. The practice dates back to 1566, the time the bridge was built, and an event was held every summer in front of population. The first recorded instance of someone diving off the bridge is from 1664. In 1968 a formal diving competition was inaugurated and held every summer.

Počitelj is situated on a hill near Mostar and is easily accessible by bus. As with many other Bosnian sites, this town is Ottoman in design. It is a historic fortified town with a hostel (caravanserai) and a hamam beneath. A traditional mosque is there. During the Bosnian War Počitelj was badly damaged and most of its residents fled and never returned

World War II: Battle of the Neretva 

The famous Battle of Neretva is a 1969 Oscar-nominated motion picture depicting events from the Second World War and the actual Battle of the Neretva. Codenamed Fall Weiß, the operation was a German plan for a combined attack launched in early 1943 against Yugoslav Partisans throughout occupied Yugoslavia. The offensive took place between January and April 1943. The operation used to be known, in socialist Yugoslav times, as the Fourth Enemy Offensive, or as the Battle for the Wounded.

At one point during the battle, the Partisans were caught in a pocket with their back to the Neretva River. Near Jablanica, 20,000 Partisans under command of Marshal Josip Broz Tito struggled to save some 4500 wounded comrades and typhus patients together with the Supreme Headquarters and Main Hospital, against some 150,000 Axis combatants.

In popular culture
Celebrated Bosnian and Herzegovinian poet, Mak Dizdar often used the river Neretva as motif in his poetry, alongside other historical, cultural and natural feature of his native Herzegovina.
The famous Battle of Neretva is a 1969 Oscar-nominated motion picture depicting events from the World War II and the actual Battle of the Neretva. 
Many folk songs are written or performed with the Neretva as main theme.

Gallery

See also
 Vrelo Bosne
 Vrelo Bune
 Bunica
 Vrelo Bunice
 Trebišnjica
 List of national parks of BiH
 Environmental impacts of reservoirs
 Environment and electricity generation
 Tourism in Bosnia and Herzegovina

References

External links

 The Dinaric Arc Sustainable Hydropower Initiative
 WWF - Neretva & Trebisnjica
 WWF - Living Neretva Project
 IUCN & WWF project - Environment for People in the Dinaric Arc 
 Balkan Rivers – The Blue Heart of Europe
 WWF - Parks Dinarides
 Rafting on the Neretva

 
Rivers of Bosnia and Herzegovina
Canyons and gorges of Bosnia and Herzegovina
Protected areas of Bosnia and Herzegovina
Nature conservation in Bosnia and Herzegovina
Environment of Bosnia and Herzegovina
Rivers of Croatia
International rivers of Europe
Ramsar sites in Croatia
Ramsar sites in Bosnia and Herzegovina
Archaeology of Illyria
 
Rivers of the Dinaric Alps